Kim Ok-ju (born 20 February 1988) is a South Korean field hockey player. At the 2012 Summer Olympics she competed with the Korea women's national field hockey team in the women's tournament. She competed at the 2010 and 2010 Asian Games.

She won a gold medal as a member of the South Korean team at 2014 Asian Games.

References

External links
 

1988 births
Living people
South Korean female field hockey players
Asian Games medalists in field hockey
Asian Games gold medalists for South Korea
Asian Games silver medalists for South Korea
Field hockey players at the 2010 Asian Games
Field hockey players at the 2012 Summer Olympics
Field hockey players at the 2014 Asian Games
Field hockey players at the 2018 Asian Games
Medalists at the 2010 Asian Games
Medalists at the 2014 Asian Games
Olympic field hockey players of South Korea
Field hockey players from Seoul
20th-century South Korean women
21st-century South Korean women